Schakira Robert Reinoso (born 5 September 1996) is a Cuban handball player for La Habana and the Cuban national team.

She represented Cuba at the 2019 World Women's Handball Championship.

References

1996 births
Living people
Cuban female handball players
Central American and Caribbean Games bronze medalists for Cuba
Competitors at the 2018 Central American and Caribbean Games
Handball players at the 2019 Pan American Games
Pan American Games medalists in handball
Pan American Games bronze medalists for Cuba
Central American and Caribbean Games medalists in handball
Medalists at the 2019 Pan American Games
21st-century Cuban women